The Saint-Georges City Council (in French: Le conseil municipal de Saint-Georges) is the governing body for the mayor–council government in the city of Saint-Georges, Quebec in the Chaudière-Appalaches region. The council consists of the mayor and eight councillors.

Current Saint-Georges City Council 
Claude Morin, mayor
Serge Thomassin, District 1 councillor
Tom Redmond, District 2 councillor
Jean Perron, District 3 councillor
Esther Fortin, District 4 councillor
Manon Bougie, District 5 councillor
Jean-Pierre Fortier, District 6 councillor
Olivier Duval, District 7 councillor
Renaud Fortier, District 8 councillor

References

External links 
 Saint-Georges City Council

Municipal councils in Quebec
Saint-Georges, Quebec